Victoria High School is a historic high school building located at Victoria, Lunenburg County, Virginia. It was built in 1922–1923, and is a one-story, five bay, brick building on a raised basement in the Classical Revival style. The front facade features a pedimented portico with round wooden Doric order columns and square pilasters.  The portico projects from a pavilion that spans the center three bays of the school's front facade.  It was the principal public school building for white students from the date of its construction until it closed in 1966.

It was listed on the National Register of Historic Places in 1996.

References

School buildings on the National Register of Historic Places in Virginia
Neoclassical architecture in Virginia
School buildings completed in 1923
Schools in Lunenburg County, Virginia
National Register of Historic Places in Lunenburg County, Virginia
1923 establishments in Virginia